Tournai railway station, officially Tournai, is a railway station in Tournai, Belgium, situated on railway line 94. It is operated by the National Railway Company of Belgium (SNCB/NMBS).

History

The first train arrived there on 24 January 1842. A first neoclassical stone building dating from the 1840s was later dismantled and replaced to serve as the railway station of the town of Leuze-en-Hainaut.

The current station building was designed by the architect Henri Beyaert and erected between 1874 and 1879. The monumental building originally included a glass and iron construction covering the platforms and rails, and a freight station located in a separate building conceived in the form of a late-medieval Flemish cloth hall.

The buildings were severely damaged during World War II. The structure covering the platforms and rails was demolished and replaced by simple awnings covering the platforms.

Train services
The station is served by the following services:
 Intercity services (IC-06) Tournai - Ath - Halle - Brussels - Brussels Airport
 Intercity services (IC-19) Lille - Tournai - Saint-Ghislain - Mons - Charleroi - Namur
 Intercity services (IC-25) Mouscron - Tournai - Saint-Ghislain - Mons - Charleroi - Namur - Huy - Liege - Liers (weekends)
 Intercity services (IC-26) Kortrijk - Tournai - Halle - Brussels - Dendermonde - Lokeren - Sint Niklaas (weekdays)
 Local services (L-29) Tournai - Saint-Ghislain - Mons - Ath - Geraardsbergen (weekdays)
 Local services (TER Hauts-de-France P81) Tournai - Ascq - Lille

See also
 List of railway stations in Belgium

References

Railway stations in Belgium
Railway stations in Belgium opened in 1842
Railway stations in Hainaut (province)
Tournai